Raajavamsam is a 2021 Indian Tamil-language family drama film written and directed by debutant K. V. Kathirvelu and produced by Chendur Film International. The film stars M. Sasikumar, Nikki Galrani with a supporting cast including Radha Ravi, Yogi Babu, Sathish and Vijayakumar. The film featured music composed by Sam C. S. The film was released in theatres on 26 November 2021 and received negative reviews from critics and it got bombed in the box office.

Plot 
A young man, amidst a prestigious project in his IT firm, goes to his village to visit his family and meet his future bride. However, he learns that she is in love with his relative.

Cast

Soundtrack 

The soundtrack and score was composed by Sam C. S.

Release 
The film was released theatrically on 26 November 2021. The Satellite rights was purchased by SunTV. Television premiere occurred on 15 January 2022.

Reception 
Bharat Kumar of News Today said "the movie has moments that would appeal to family audience. But at some places it is trying to be more a melodrama laying thrust on family, bonding and emotions." ABP Live wrote, "Raajavamsam is an exhausting family drama that is not rooted in reality." Avinash Ramachandran of Cinema Express gave a rating of 1.5 out on 5 and wrote, "Raajavamsam prefers sticking to a tried and tested template that just ends up being tired and wasted." Suganth of The Times of India gave a rating of 1 out on 5 and wrote, "The film qualifies as an absolute cringefest with zero redeeming qualities."

References

External links 
 

Indian action drama films
2021 directorial debut films
Films scored by Sam C. S.